Gianni Demadonna (born 14 June 1954) is a former Italian male long-distance runner who competed at five editions of the IAAF World Cross Country Championships (from 1977 to 1987). He also won a  national championship at the senior level. He currently works as an athletics agent.

Achievements

References

External links
 
 

1954 births
Living people
Italian male long-distance runners
Italian sports agents
Italian male cross country runners